Edward Adams Stacco (April 16, 1924 – April 6, 2007) was an American football offensive tackle in the National Football League for the Detroit Lions and the Washington Redskins.  He played college football at Colgate University and was drafted in the 25th round of the 1946 NFL Draft.

1924 births
2007 deaths
People from the Scranton–Wilkes-Barre metropolitan area
American football offensive tackles
Colgate Raiders football players
Detroit Lions players
Washington Redskins players